Pingguoyuan may refer to:
 Pingguoyuan Subdistrict, Beijing, a sub-district of Shijingshan District, Beijing, China
 Pingguoyuan Road, a road named after the area
 Pingguoyuan station, a subway station named after the area
 , a sub-district of Shunhe Hui District, Kaifeng, China

See also
 Pingguo, a city in Guangxi, China
 Guoyuan station
 apple orchard, the literal meaning of the noun